Baghu (also Romanized as Bāghū and Bāqū) is a village in Anzan-e Sharqi Rural District, in the Central District of Bandar-e Gaz County, Golestan Province, Iran. At the 2006 census, its population was 653, in 173 families.

References 

Populated places in Bandar-e Gaz County